Cinema of Palestine is relatively young in comparison to Arab cinema as a whole. Palestinian films are not exclusively produced in Arabic and some are even produced in English and French. Elia Suleiman has emerged as one of the most notable working Palestinian directors.

History

The first period: The beginning, 1935–48

The first Palestinian film to be made is generally believed to be a documentary on King Ibn Saud of Saudi Arabia's visit in 1935 to Palestine, made by Ibrahim Hassan Sirhan (or Serhan), based in Jaffa. Sirhan followed the King and around Palestine, "from Lod to Jaffa and from Jaffa to Tel Aviv". The result was a silent movie that was presented at the Nabi Rubin festivals. Following this documentary, Sirhan joined Jamal al-Asphar to produce a 45-minute film called The Realized Dreams, aiming to "promote the orphans' cause". Sirhan and al-Asphar also produced a documentary about Ahmad Hilmi Pasha, a member of the Higher Arab Commission. In 1945 Sirhan established the Arab Film Company with Ahmad Hilmi al-Kilani. The company launched the feature film Holiday Eve, which was followed by preparations for the next film A Storm at Home. The films themselves were lost in 1948, when Sirhan had to flee Jaffa after the town was bombarded.

The second period: The epoch of silence, 1948–67
The 1948 Palestinian exodus (known in Arabic as the Nakba) had a devastating effect on Palestinian society, including its nascent film industry. Cinematic endeavours, requiring infrastructure, professional crews, and finance, nearly ceased for two decades. Individual Palestinian participated in the film-production of neighbouring countries. It is reported that Sirhan was involved with the production of the first Jordanian feature film, The Struggle in Jarash (1957), and another Palestinian, Abdallah Ka'wash, directed the second Jordanian feature film, My Homeland, My Love, in 1964.

The third period: Cinema in exile, 1968–82
After 1967, Palestinian cinema found itself under the auspices of the PLO, funded by Fatah and other Palestinian organisations like PFLP and DFLP. More than 60 films were made in this period, mostly documentaries. The first film festival dedicated to Palestinian films was held in Baghdad in 1973, and Baghdad also hosted the next two Palestinian film festivals, in 1976 and 1980. Mustafa Abu Ali was one of the early Palestinian film directors, and he helped found the Palestinian Cinema Association in Beirut in 1973. Only one dramatic movie was made during the period, namely Return to Haifa in 1982, an adaptation of a short novel by Ghassan Kanafani.

The film archives disappearance, 1982
Different organisations set up archives for Palestinian films. The largest such archive was run by PLO's Film Foundation/Palestinian Film Unit. In 1982, when the PLO was forced out of Beirut, the archive was put into storage (in the Red Crescenty Hospital), from where it "disappeared" under circumstances which are still unclear. Recently, several films from the archive were located in the Israel Defense Forces Archive in Tel HaShomer by scholar and curator Rona Sela. Sela has called for the release of these films, and for the declassification of other Palestinian films that remain closed in the IDF Archive.

The fourth period: The return home, from 1980 to the present
The 1996 drama/comedy Chronicle of a Disappearance received international critical acclaim, and it became the first Palestinian movie to receive national release in the United States. A break-out film for its genre, it won a New Director's Prize at the Seattle International Film Festival and a Luigi De Laurentiis Award at the Venice Film Festival. Notable film directors of this period include Michel Khleifi, Rashid Masharawi, Ali Nassar and Elia Suleiman.

An international effort was launched in 2008 to reopen Cinema Jenin, a cinema located in the Jenin Refugee Camp.

In 2008, three Palestinian feature films and an estimated eight shorts were completed, more than ever before.

In 2010, Hamas, the governing authority in the Gaza Strip, announced the completion of a new film. Titled The Great Liberation, the film depicts the destruction of Israel by Palestinians.

Currently in the Gaza Strip, all film projects must be approved by Hamas' Culture Ministry before they can be screened in public. Independent filmmakers have claimed that the Culture Ministry cracks down on content not conforming to Hamas edicts. In a notable 2010 case, Hamas banned the short film Something Sweet, directed by Khalil al-Muzzayen, which was submitted at the Cannes Film Festival. Hamas banned it from being shown locally due to a four-second scene where a woman is shown with her hair uncovered. In 2011, a film festival hosted by the Gaza Women's Affairs Center included documentaries and fictional pieces on women's issues, but the Culture Ministry censored numerous scenes. One film had to remove a scene where a woman lowered one shoulder of her dress, and another had to remove a scene of a man swearing.

Notable directors

 Yahya Barakat
 Azza El-Hassan
 Hany Abu-Assad
 Mohammed Almughanni
 Mahdi Fleifel
 Scandar Copti
 Mustafa Abu Ali
 Mohammed Bakri
 Tarek Al Eryan
 Annemarie Jacir
 Michel Khleifi
 Rashid Masharawi
 Mai Masri
 Montaser Marai
 Rosalind Nashashibi
 Ali Nassar
 Mohammad Al-Sawalma
 Hazim Bitar
 Elia Suleiman
 Leila Sansour
 Refat Adi
 Sameh Zoabi
 Tawfik Abu Wael
 Ameen Nayfeh
 Mohammad Shihadeh Hmedat
 Najwa Najjar
 Hisham Zreiq

Notable films

 A World Not Ours Alam laysa lana
 They Don't Exist Coming Home: Palestinian Cinema
 Wedding in Galilee (1987) (International Critics Prize, Cannes),
 Tale of the Three Jewels (1994)
 Chronicle of a Disappearance (1996) (“Luigi De Laurentiis” Award for a Debut Film at the 1996 Venice Film Festival)
 Divine Intervention (2002).
 Olive Harvest, The (2003)
 Arna's Children (2003)
 Jeremy Hardy vs. the Israeli Army (2004)
 Women in Struggle (2004)
 Waiting (2005)
 Paradise Now (2006) (Golden Globe for Best Foreign Language Film winner)
 The Color of Olives (2006)
 Iron Wall (2006)
 Goal Dreams (2006)
 First Picture (2006)
 The Sons of Eilaboun (2007)
 Maria's Grotto (2007) (Silver Muhr Award, Dubai International Film Festival)
 Kaffa! (2007) (Silver Award for Short Film, Cairo International TV and Media Festival)(Gold Award for Best Script, Tunis International TV and Media Festival)
 Salt of this Sea (2008)
 Taste the Revolution (2008)
 The View (2008) (Best Short Film ($75,000), Middle East International Film Festival)
 Till When? (2008) (Officially selected in Cergy Pontoise Film Festival in Paris, Honorable Mention in Digicon 6 Festival in Tokyo)
 Spider Web (2009)
 Beyond the Sun (2010) (Audience Choice, Bagdad International Film Festival)
cup final (1991) takes place during the Israeli invasion of Lebanon.
 The Uppercut (2012) A Short Documentary Shot in Jordan Telling a Story of a Slum Kickboxing Club
 Solomon's Stone (film) (2015)

Notable film festivals

A 

 Al Ard Film Festival (Cagliari, Sardinia)

B 
Mostra de Cinema Àrab i Mediterrani de Catalunya (Arab and Mediterranean Film Festival of Catalonia) – Barcelona
Boston Palestine Film Festival
Muestra de Cine Palestino de Buenos Aires (Buenos Aires Palestine Film Festival)

C
Chicago Palestine Film Festival

D
DC Palestinian Film and Arts Festival

H
Houston Palestine Film Festival

K
The Palestinian Film Festival - Kuwait

L
 London Palestine Film Festival

M
 Muestra de Cine Palestino de Madrid (Madrid Palestine Film Festival)
Mizna's Twin Cities Arab Film Festival
Festival Cinéma Méditerranéen Montpellier (Montpellier Mediterranean Film Festival)

R
Al-Kasaba International Film Festival Al- Kasaba International Film Festival, in Ramallah, West Bank

S
Muestra de Cine Palestino de Santiago (Santiago Palestine Film Festival)
Muestra de Cine Palestino de Sevilla (Sevilla Palestine Film Festival)

T
Toronto Palestine Film Festival

See also
 Cinema City Nablus
 Al-Kasaba Theatre
 Cinema Jenin

References

Further reading
Rapfogel, Jared: A Report of Dreams of a Nation - A Palestinian Film Festival, January 24–27, 2003, Senses of Cinema.
Palestinian film festival planned, 18 May 2004, BBC
Dabashi, Hamid: For a Fistful of Dust: A Passage to Palestine, 23–29 September 2004, Al-Ahram
Film Jan. 14, 2006, IMEU,
 Kemp, Rebecca: “Interviews with Palestinian Filmmakers”, 6 Degrees Film, Fall 2006
 Rastegar, Kamran, "Palestine Only Exists in Cinema", Bidoun Magazine, Issue 8, Vol. 1, Fall 2006
  
Annemarie Jacir: Coming Home: Palestinian Cinema, 27 February 2007, The Electronic Intifada
Khaled Elayya: A Brief History of Palestinian Cinema, This week in Palestine
Khadija Habshneh: Palestinian Revolution Cinema , This week in Palestine
Nana Asfour: Reclaiming Palestine, One Film at a Time, Cineaste Magazine, Vol. XXXIV, No. 3, Summer 2009
Nana Asfour: Cineaste Magazine - Articles - The Time That Remains and Zindeeq (Web Exclusive) The Time That Remains and Zindeeq, Cineaste Magazine, Web Exclusive, Copyright © 2011 by Cineaste Publishers, Inc.

External links
 Dreams of a Nation, an independent project founded to provide resources and information on Palestinian cinema. Based at Columbia University, United States.
 Palestinian Film: News and Reviews at IMEU.net
 Review of a film that explores the story of the lost archives of the PLO film unit
 History and Trends in Palestinian Filmmaking
 Finding aid to the Palestinian Films Collection, 1976-2008, at Columbia University. Rare Book & Manuscript Library.

Literature
Dabashi, Hamid, and Said, Edward (preface) (2006): Dreams Of A Nation: On Palestinian Cinema, Verso Books, London, United Kingdom, 
Gertz, Nurith; Khleifi, George (2008): Palestinian Cinema: Landscape, Trauma, and Memory, Indiana University Press.